Presidential elections were held in Portugal on 6 December 1919. Following Portugal's 1911 constitution, the Congress of the Republic must elect the president in Lisbon instead of the Portuguese people.

There were a total of 7 candidates. António José de Almeida of the Evolutionist Party won against his opponents and he was elected as the new President of Portugal.

Results

References

Portugal
1919 elections in Portugal
1919
December 1919 events